Cleveland was a county constituency in the Langbaurgh Wapentake (also known as Cleveland), North Riding of Yorkshire, England.

Electorate
It returned one Member of Parliament (MP)  to the British House of Commons, using the first past the post voting system.  All elections were conducted with a secret ballot, which had been introduced under the Ballot Act 1872.

The franchise was initially restricted, and extended on several occasions:
 The Representation of the People Act 1884 gave a vote to adult males who met a property qualification; women, and about 40% of men, had no vote
 The Representation of the People Act 1918 extended the vote to all adult males and to women over the age of 30 who met certain property qualifications
 The Representation of the People Act 1928 allowed women to vote from age 21, on the same terms as men
 The Representation of the People Act 1948 abolished the plural votes previously granted to electors who met a property qualification because of their business or shop premises
 The Representation of the People Act 1969 lowered the voting age to 18

History
The Cleveland constituency was created when the North Riding of Yorkshire constituency was divided by the Redistribution of Seats Act 1885, and Cleveland then covered the northern tip of the North Riding.

In 1918 it was redefined in terms of local government areas, and covered part of Guisborough Rural District and the Middlesbrough Rural District, along with the urban districts of Eston, Guisborough, Hinderwell, Loftus, Redcar, Saltburn by the Sea and Skelton and Brotton.  In 1948 it was redefined again to cover Eston, Guisborough, Loftus, Redcar, Saltburn and Marske by the Sea and Skelton and Brotton; the new boundaries were first used for the 1950 general election. As such it was a socially mixed constituency throughout its existence, containing working class Middlesbrough suburbs and ironstone mining villages as well as middle class resorts and agricultural communities.

It returned its last Member of Parliament in 1970, by which time Cleveland district of Yorkshire's North Riding had been abolished in 1967, to the House of Commons of the Parliament of the United Kingdom until it was abolished leading up to the February 1974 general election.

It was replaced by the Redcar constituency and Cleveland & Whitby constituency.

Members of Parliament

Elections

Elections in the 1880s

Elections in the 1890s 

Pease's death causes a by-election.

Elections in the 1900s

Elections in the 1910s 

General Election 1914–15:

Another General Election was required to take place before the end of 1915. The political parties had been making preparations for an election to take place and by the July 1914, the following candidates had been selected; 
Liberal: Herbert Samuel
Unionist: Park Goff
Labour: Harry Dack

Elections in the 1920s

Elections in the 1930s

Elections in the 1940s 
General Election 1939–40:

Another General Election was required to take place before the end of 1940. The political parties had been making preparations for an election to take place from 1939 and by the end of this year, the following candidates had been selected; 
Conservative: Robert Tatton Bower
Labour: William Mansfield 
Liberal: Matthew Robinson Shawcross

Elections in the 1950s

Elections in the 1960s

Elections in the 1970s

References

Craig, F. W. S. (1983). British parliamentary election results 1918–1949 (3 ed.). Chichester: Parliamentary Research Services. .
 

Parliamentary constituencies in North East England (historic)
Constituencies of the Parliament of the United Kingdom established in 1885
Constituencies of the Parliament of the United Kingdom disestablished in 1974